The Gazi Hasan Pasha Mosque is an Ottoman-era mosque in the Aegean island of Kos, in Greece. Built in the 18th century, it serves the Muslim-Turkish community of Kos, as one of the two out of the five Ottoman mosques to be still operational and open for prayers on Kos, the other being the Defterdar Mosque.

History 
The mosque was built in 1778 or in between 1784-85, in the village of Platani in Kos by the Algerian Gazi Hasan Pasha, likely on the site of a previous building. The mosque, particularly its minaret, was heavily damaged in an 1933 earthquake, and was thereafter repaired by the Italians, who held Kos at the time. It was further damaged during the 2017 Aegean Sea earthquake, whereupon plans for extensive restoration were announced.

Structure 
Following the usual Ottoman style, the narthex and the mihrab is found on the ground floor, while on the upper floor contains the women's cloister, accessible by a staircase. There is a marble fountain in the courtyard area, which was used to grind wheat.

See also 
 Islam in Greece
 List of mosques in Greece

References

Further reading 
 History of the Island of Kos: Ancient, Medieval, Modern, by Vasilis S. Hatzivasileiou, published 2013.

External links 
 

Ottoman mosques in Greece
Kos
18th-century architecture in Greece
18th-century mosques